Gabsara Union is a union of Bhuapur Upazila, Tangail District, Bangladesh. It is situated 37 km north of Tangail. The union is fully detached from road transportation, located in the middle of Jamuna River.

Demographics

According to Population Census 2011 performed by Bangladesh Bureau of Statistics, The total population of Gabsara union is 26678. There are 6243 households in total.

Education

The literacy rate of Gabsara Union is 46.1% (Male-28.6%, Female-26.2%).

See also
 Union Councils of Tangail District

References

Populated places in Dhaka Division
Populated places in Tangail District
Unions of Bhuapur Upazila